Blysmus rufus is a species of sedge belonging to the family Cyperaceae.

Its native range is Europe to Mongolia, Subarctic America to Canada.

References

Cyperaceae